Mălușteni is a commune in Vaslui County, Western Moldavia, Romania. It is composed of six villages: Ghireasca, Lupești, Mălușteni, Mânăstirea, Mânzătești and Țuțcani.

The commune has an area of 55.53 km2.

References

Communes in Vaslui County
Localities in Western Moldavia